Heffron Drive was an American duo formed by Kendall Schmidt and Dustin Belt, both originally from Kansas. It was originally formed in 2008 after Kendall and Dustin met each other by chance and realized they lived on the same street, Heffron Drive, Burbank, California.

History 
In 2008, Kendall Schmidt and Dustin Belt formed the band Heffron Drive. The name refers to the street on which both members lived, Heffron Drive, in Burbank, California. In 2009 Schmidt joined the boyband Big Time Rush and Heffron Drive was on a break. In May 2013, after Tanya Chisholm said that the series Big Time Rush was not being continued, Heffron Drive was revived. On October 17, 2013, it was announced that Heffron Drive would be going on a winter tour, it started in Houston on November 23, and ended on December 22 in Los Angeles. On January 14, 2017, the band released a new song and music video for their single "Living Room". Their next release was on January 19, 2018 when they released a new song and music video titled "Mad At The World", and later "Separate Lives".

Discography

Studio albums

Live albums

Extended plays

Singles

Tours
Winter Tour (2013–2014)
Happy Mistakes Tour (2014–2016)
Summer Tour (2016)
The Slow Motion Tour (2017)
One Way Ticket Tour (2017–2018)

References

External links

Official Winter Tour site

Musical groups established in 2008
Musical groups disestablished in 2009
Musical groups reestablished in 2013
American musical duos
American pop music groups
American electro musicians